Adria Vasil is a Canadian environmental journalist. She started writing NOW Magazine's Ecoholic column in 2004 and has published three books based on her column: Ecoholic (2007), Ecoholic Home (2009), and Ecoholic Body (2012). Vasil is a lecturer at the Ryerson School of Journalism, from which she herself graduated in 2003. Beyond her post-graduate degree in magazine journalism from Ryerson, she has a degree in political science and cultural anthropology from the University of Toronto. She lives in Toronto.

Writing

Column 

Vasil started at NOW Magazine as an intern in 2001 and freelanced for NOW until she was hired as a staff news journalist in 2003. She soon was writing regularly for them about environmental issues. Her column, Ecoholic started in 2004 after she began taking reader questions on the environment and green living.

Books 

Ecoholic, Vasil's first book was published by Vintage Canada (an imprint of Random House) in 2007. David Suzuki said, "This book is for people who want to do something to lighten their impact on the planet. The small steps cost us little in the way of effort, money or time, but the cumulative effects can be enormous."

Ecoholic Home (Vintage Canada 2009) further explores how to live a greener life, this time focusing on our day-to-day home-life. Lindsay Borthwick, of Green Living Online says Ecoholic Home gives "informed, affordable and practical advice on how to green your home on any budget, going on to test the brands making the big green claims to help you make the right choice."

Ecoholic Body (Vintage Canada 2012) Vasil's newest in her Ecoholic series, is, according to The Globe and Mail "An eclectic guide to enviro-friendly body products – think shampoo, toothpaste, jewellery, dildos – Ecoholic Body  is part Consumer Reports, part political manifesto." In Ecoholic Body, Vasil has created a list of the "Mean 15," 15 chemicals that we should be checking for and avoiding.

References

External links 
 The Lavin Agency | Speaker Adria Vasil
 Kick-Ass Canadians | Adria Vasil
 Twitter | @EcoholicNation
 Ecoholic.ca
 Quill & Quire Review of Ecoholic
 Ecoholic Body | Adria Vasil Says You Can Live Healthy and Still Look Good
 Ecoholic.ca | The Mean 15
 

Canadian columnists
Canadian women journalists
Writers from Montreal
Living people
Canadian women non-fiction writers
Year of birth missing (living people)
Canadian women columnists